WISE 2056+1459 (full designation WISEPC J205628.90+145953.3) is a brown dwarf of spectral class Y0, located in constellation Delphinus at approximately 23.2 light-years from Earth.

History of observations

Discovery
WISE 2056+1459 was discovered in 2011 from data, collected by Wide-field Infrared Survey Explorer (WISE) Earth-orbiting satellite — NASA infrared-wavelength 40 cm (16 in) space telescope, which mission lasted from December 2009 to February 2011. WISE 2056+1459 has two discovery papers: Kirkpatrick et al. (2011) and Cushing et al. (2011), however, basically with the same authors and published nearly simultaneously.

Kirkpatrick et al. presented discovery of 98 new found by WISE brown dwarf systems with components of spectral types M, L, T and Y, among which also was WISE 2056+1459.
Cushing et al. presented discovery of seven brown dwarfs — one of T9.5 type, and six of Y-type — first members of the Y spectral class, ever discovered and spectroscopically confirmed, including "archetypal member" of the Y spectral class WISE 1828+2650, and WISE 2056+1459. These seven objects are also the faintest seven of 98 brown dwarfs, presented in Kirkpatrick et al. (2011).

Distance

Space motion
WISE 2056+1459 has a proper motion of  milliarcseconds per year.

Temperature

See also
The other six discoveries of brown dwarfs, published in Cushing et al. (2011):
WISE 0148-7202 (T9.5)
WISE 0410+1502 (Y0)
WISE 1405+5534 (Y0 (pec?))
WISE 1541-2250 (Y0.5)
WISE 1738+2732 (Y0)
WISE 1828+2650 (≥Y2)

Notes

References

Brown dwarfs
Y-type stars
Delphinus (constellation)
20110901
WISE objects